Gaston De Wael (31 December 1934 – 6 March 2008) was a Belgian footballer. He played in two matches for the Belgium national football team from 1956 to 1957.

References

External links
 
 

1934 births
2008 deaths
Belgian footballers
Belgium international footballers
Footballers from Brussels
Association football forwards
R.S.C. Anderlecht players
RWS Bruxelles players
K.F.C. Rhodienne-De Hoek players